Robert Bailey Thomas (April 24, 1766 - May 19, 1846), also spelled Robert Bayley Thomas, was an American who created, and for a long time published, the Old Farmer's Almanac. Thomas was born in Grafton, Massachusetts, served for a time as a schoolteacher and then bookbinder and book seller. In 1792 he began his almanac which he continued to edit until his death, and which continues in print to this day.

References 
 The Old Farmer and His Almanack, by George Lyman Kittredge, William Ware and Company, Boston, 1904. Beginning at page 5, with "The Education of Robert Bailey Thomas..." and going to page 8 this book speaks about how Robert Bailey Thomas worked as a schoolteacher, bookbinder and bookseller before in 1792 preparing the first issue of the almanac which was for the year of 1793.

American publishers (people)
18th-century publishers (people)
18th-century American businesspeople
19th-century publishers (people)
19th-century American businesspeople
People from Grafton, Massachusetts
Businesspeople from Massachusetts
1766 births
1846 deaths